Vesper is an unincorporated community in Lincoln County, Kansas, United States.

History
Vesper was laid out in 1886 when the railroad was extended to that point.

The post office in Vesper was discontinued in 1966.

Education
The community is served by Sylvan–Lucas USD 299 public school district.

Vesper High School was established in 1914. Hunter, Sylvan Grove and Vesper schools united to form Sylvan Unified schools in 1966. In 2010, Sylvan Unified united with Lucas-Luray schools to form Sylvan-Lucas Unified schools.

The Vesper High School mascot was Vesper Cardinals. Sylvan Unified as well as Sylvan-Lucas Unified mascot is the Mustangs.

References

Further reading

External links
 Lincoln County maps: Current, Historic, KDOT

Unincorporated communities in Lincoln County, Kansas
Unincorporated communities in Kansas